The 16th Internationales ADAC-Eifelrennen was a motor race, run to Formula Two rules, held on 25 May 1952 at the Nürburgring circuit. The race was run over 7 laps of the circuit, and was won by Swiss driver Rudi Fischer in a Ferrari 500. Fischer also set pole and fastest lap. Stirling Moss finished second and Ken Wharton was third.

Results

References

Eifelrennen
Eifelrennen
Eifelrennen